János Irinyi (sometimes also spelled János Irínyi; ; 18 May 1817 – 17 December 1895) was a Hungarian chemist and inventor of the noiseless and non-explosive match. He achieved this by mixing the yellow (also called white) phosphorus with lead dioxide instead of the potassium chlorate used previously.

Irinyi also took part in the Hungarian Revolution of 1848.

Asteroid 
Asteroid 106869 Irinyi, discovered by Hungarian astronomer Krisztián Sárneczky and László L. Kiss at Piszkéstető Station in 2000, was named in his memory. The official  was published by the Minor Planet Center on 22 January 2008.

References

External links 
 János Irinyi

1817 births
1895 deaths
People from Bihor County
Hungarian inventors
Hungarian chemists